10 Merchant Street is a Category B listed building in Peterhead, Aberdeenshire, Scotland. Dating to around 1800, the building, which stands at the corner of Merchant and St Andrew Streets, became the ten-room Waverley Hotel in 1886. It was originally the Royal Hotel. It is constructed of ashlar stone.

See also
List of listed buildings in Peterhead, Aberdeenshire

References

External links
 Waverley Hotel official website

Category B listed buildings in Aberdeenshire
Merchant Street 10
Listed hotels in Scotland